Involuntary park is a neologism coined by science fiction author and environmentalist Bruce Sterling to describe previously inhabited areas that for environmental, economic, or political reasons have, in Sterling's words, "lost their value for technological instrumentalism" and been allowed to return to an overgrown, feral state.

Origin of the term
Discussing involuntary parks in the context of rising sea levels due to global warming, Sterling writes:

While Sterling's original vision of an involuntary park was of places abandoned due to collapse of economy or rising sea-level, the term has come to be used on any land where human inhabitation or use for one reason or other has been stopped, including military exclusion zones, minefields, and areas considered dangerous due to pollution.

Existing examples

Abandoned human settlements and developments overtaken by foliage and wild animals are known to exist in numerous locations around the world. Ghost towns, disused railways, mines, and airfields, or areas experiencing urban decay or deindustrialization may be subject to a resurgence in ecological proliferation as human presence is reduced.

The Chernobyl Exclusion Zone has seen the return of previously extirpated indigenous species such as boars, wolves, and bears, as well as a thriving herd of re-introduced Przewalski's horses. While wildlife flourishes in the least affected areas, tumors, infertility and lower brain weight are reported in many small animals (including mice and birds) living in areas subject to severe contamination.

The former Rocky Mountain Arsenal in Denver was abandoned for years due to contamination from production of chemical weapons, yet the wildlife returned and the site was eventually turned into a wildlife refugium.

Involuntary parks where human presence is severely limited can host animal species that are otherwise extremely threatened in their range. The Korean Demilitarized Zone is hypothesized to house not only Korean tigers, but also the critically endangered Amur leopard, although neither have been photographed there since the late 20th century.

While the above examples may be considered involuntary parks, Sterling's dystopian vision of an "unnatural" ecology has yet to be observed. In most observed cases, existing involuntary parks are characterized by a restoration of the pre-human ecological order, as opposed to the novel environment theorized by Sterling. 

When an involuntary park develops in an urban or formerly urban location, it may become the target of urban exploration.

Further examples include:

 Cattle Island, in the flood pond of Hirakud Dam.
 The Green Line in Cyprus.
 The Frontier Closed Area in Hong Kong.
 The White Sands Missile Range U.S. government military reservation. Location of the Trinity test site.
 The stringent military control of the Iron Curtain has left a large green corridor across Europe. An initiative is underway to protect this former involuntary wilderness as a European Green Belt.
 The waterfront of Hilo, Hawaii, was stricken by two devastating tsunamis and the strip was abandoned and made into parkland.
 The land formerly occupied by a residential area in Anchorage, Alaska was cracked and disfigured beyond usefulness by the Good Friday earthquake, and was converted into a park named Earthquake Park. 
 The neighborhood that formerly surrounded Love Canal.
 The former U.S. navy areas of Vieques, Puerto Rico.
 Abandoned fishing villages preserved on Gouqi Island, Zhoushan Islands in China. 
 Montebello Islands, Australia, site of nuclear tests.
 Times Beach, Missouri, a town evacuated and dismantled due to dioxin contamination, now the site of Route 66 State Park.
 The Ecological Reserve (Reserva Ecológica) in the city of Buenos Aires, Argentina, formed by a land-fill of waste material of demolished buildings dumped in the river off Costanera Sud avenue. Over time, sand and sediment began to build up and developed itself into a biodiversity sample of the native Llanura Pampeana ecosystem.
 Parts of the Eifel National Park are closed to the public because of mines planted during the Second World War.
 Red House, New York and Elko, New York, seized by the state of New York in the mid-20th century for several public works projects, including Allegany State Park, the Allegheny Reservoir and the Southern Tier Expressway. Much of the land was eventually converted to "voluntary" (official) parks, though areas of the Allegany Indian Reservation (particularly portions of former New York State Route 17) have been closed off and left to nature.
 Centralia, Pennsylvania, a town abandoned due to a coal mine fire.
 The Hanford Reach National Monument, the former buffer zone around the Hanford Site which produced plutonium for nuclear bombs.
 Ujung Kulon National Park in Java formed itself on farmland devastated and depopulated by the 1883 eruption of Krakatoa; it is now a maintained national park.
 The Văcărești Nature Park in Bucharest, Romania.
 Many urban and rural parts of Bosnia-Herzegovina, Croatia and Kosovo, due to unexploded ordnance.
 Old Town Negaunee, Michigan; a portion of the town abandoned after being undermined by local iron ore mining.
 Parts of the Iron Curtain that divided Germany during the Cold War have never been cleared of landmines, resulting in said areas being closed off to the public, allowing wildlife to flourish. Some parts of the so-called "death strip" allowed wolves to re-establish themselves.
 The Hanbury Crater in Staffordshire, England, which was the site of the RAF Fauld explosion.
 The Zone Rouge, former First World War battlefield located at northeastern France.
 The residential red zone in Christchurch, New Zealand, where around 8000 houses in several suburbs which suffered land damage in the 2011 Christchurch earthquake were demolished and not rebuilt.
 Areas of the Golan Heights between Israel, Syria, Lebanon, and Jordan have become a haven for Indian wolves, mountain gazelles, vultures, and other species due to minefields that prevent human access.

See also
 Rabbit à la Berlin — a documentary about the zone between East and West Germany during the Cold War
 Rewilding (conservation biology)
 Urban prairie

Notes

References

External links
 "Peace prospects imperil Korea's wildlife paradise", National Geographic
Google Earth view of Earthquake Park

Parks
Rewilding
2000s neologisms